The Askew School of Public Administration and Policy, located  in Tallahassee, Florida, is a graduate school within the Florida State University College of Social Sciences. The School was founded in 1947 and offers eight specializations within the MPA, as well as joint degree programs with Urban and Regional Planning, Social Work, Criminology and Criminal Justice, and the Florida State University College of Law. It was renamed in honor of the former governor, Reubin Askew.

National rankings
U.S. News & World Report (2020 edition)
Public Affairs - 25th overall
Local Government Management - 11th overall
Public Management and Leadership- 18th overall 
Public Finance and Budgeting - 20th overall

The Askew School of Public Administration and Policy was ranked 3rd in the nation in faculty research productivity by a study published in the International Public Management Journal.

The Askew School now offers an online MPA degree to allow greater flexibility to students or those in the workforce seeking ways to stay competitive.

References

External links

 
Public administration schools in the United States
Public policy schools
Educational institutions established in 1947
1947 establishments in Florida